Party Monster is a 2003 American biographical crime drama film written and directed by Fenton Bailey and Randy Barbato, who are also producers along with Jon Marcus and Christine Vachon. It stars Macaulay Culkin as the drug-addled "king of the Club Kids". The film tells the story of the rise and fall of the infamous New York City party promoter Michael Alig. This was Macaulay Culkin's first film in nearly nine years since his starring role in the 1994 film Richie Rich.

The film is based on Disco Bloodbath, the memoir of James St. James which details his friendship with Alig, that later fell apart as Alig's drug addiction worsened, and ended after he murdered Andre "Angel" Melendez and went to prison. Bailey and Barbato had previously directed a 1998 documentary on the murder, also called Party Monster: The Shockumentary, from which certain elements were used for this film.

Plot
The film opens with Michael Alig as a small-town outcast who lived with his mom before moving to New York. Michael learns the New York party scene from James St. James, who teaches him the "rules of fabulousness", which mostly revolve around attracting as much attention to oneself as possible.

Despite James' warning, Alig hosts a party at The Limelight, a local club owned by Peter Gatien. With Alig as its main attraction, The Limelight soon becomes the hottest club in New York. Alig is named "King of the Club Kids" and goes on a cross country journey in search of more club kids. Alig and James pick up Angel Melendez, Gitsie, and Brooke. Gitsie becomes Michael's latest sidekick although the movie implies the relationship was little more than platonic. However, after Michael descends further into drug abuse, his life starts to spiral out of control, eventually culminating in his involvement in the murder of Angel. Gitsie and Michael decide to go to rehab but ultimately return to NY with the same drug problems as before, causing Michael to lose his job and end up in a motel in New Jersey where he is arrested and sent to prison after being ousted by James. James then begins to write his "Great American Novel", published first as Disco Bloodbath and later as Party Monster.

Cast

Soundtrack
The soundtrack peaked at number 21 on the US Billboard Dance/Electronic Albums.

Release
Party Monster made its world premiere at the 2003 Sundance Film Festival on January 18, 2003, and later played at the Cannes Film Festival in May of that year. On September 5, 2003, the film was put on limited release to different art house theaters in major US cities.

Reception
The film received mainly negative reviews; it currently holds a 29% approval rating at Rotten Tomatoes based on 79 reviews; the consensus states "The lurid display of camp soon turns tedious." It was nominated for the Grand Jury Prize at the 2003 Sundance Film Festival, however, and Chicago Sun-Times critic Roger Ebert gave the film three out of four stars, calling Culkin's performance "fearless", though he remarks that "the movie lacks insight and leaves us feeling sad and empty—sad for ourselves, not Alig—and maybe it had to be that way".

The film was only given a limited release. According to Box Office Mojo, the film only grossed $742,898 domestically out of a budget of $5 million in its theatrical release.

Home media
The film was released on DVD in the United States and Canada in February 2004 through 20th Century Fox Home Entertainment; the DVD contained various cast interviews, an audio commentary, behind-the-scenes footage, the film's original theatrical trailer, and a real interview with Michael Alig as bonus materials. In 2009, the DVD has been discontinued and is now largely unavailable for purchase at standard retail stores. It is available for renting through Netflix and instant viewing.

References

External links

 
 
 
 
 

2003 films
2003 biographical drama films
2003 crime drama films
2003 independent films
2003 LGBT-related films
2000s American films
2000s English-language films
American biographical drama films
American crime drama films
American docudrama films
American independent films
American LGBT-related films
Biographical films about LGBT people
Camcorder films
Club Kids
Crime films based on actual events
Films about drugs
Films about murder
Films based on memoirs
Films produced by Christine Vachon
Films set in the 1980s
Films set in the 1990s
Films set in New York City
Killer Films films
LGBT-related drama films
World of Wonder (company) films